The Divine Comedy (A Divina Comédia) is a 1991 Portuguese drama film directed by Manoel de Oliveira. It was screened in competition at the 1991 Venice Film Festival, in which it won the Special Jury Prize.

Cast
 Maria de Medeiros as Sónia 
 Miguel Guilherme as Raskolnikov 
 Luís Miguel Cintra as Prophet 
 Mário Viegas as Philosopher 
 Leonor Silveira as Eva 
 Diogo Dória as Ivan 
 Paulo Matos as Jesus

References

External links
 

1991 films
French drama films
1990s Portuguese-language films
1991 drama films
Films directed by Manoel de Oliveira
Films produced by Paulo Branco
Venice Grand Jury Prize winners
Portuguese drama films
1990s French films